Detlef Kästner (born 20 March 1958) is a retired boxer, who represented East Germany at the 1980 Summer Olympics in Moscow, Soviet Union. There he won the bronze medal in the light middleweight division (– 71 kg), after being defeated in the semifinals by eventual silver medalist Aleksandr Koshkyn of the USSR.

Olympic results 
1st round bye
Defeated Adeoye Adetunji (Nigeria) KO 3
Defeated Leonidas Njunwa (Tanzania) 5–0
Lost to Aleksandr Koshkin (Soviet Union) 0–5

References

1958 births
Living people
People from Wurzen
Light-middleweight boxers
Boxers at the 1980 Summer Olympics
Olympic boxers of East Germany
Olympic bronze medalists for East Germany
Olympic medalists in boxing
Medalists at the 1980 Summer Olympics
German male boxers
Sportspeople from Saxony